Dorcadion sevliczi is a species of beetle in the family Cerambycidae. It was described by Mikhail Leontievich Danilevsky in 1985. It is known from the Caucasus.

References

sevliczi
Beetles described in 1985